William Pearson McPhillips (6 July 1910 – 1992) was a Scottish professional football goalkeeper who played his club football for Newcastle United. He was in the Newcastle squad that won the FA Cup in 1932.

Professional career
McPhillips was reserve goalkeeper for Newcastle and spent eight years at the club. He had very little luck keeping down a first team place. McPhillips replaced  Albert McInroy in the 1933/34 season when he sustained an injury in a 2–0 defeat at Portsmouth on 30 December 1933, which put him out for the rest of the season. He made his debut in the 9–2 win against Liverpool on New Years Day, 1934. Newcastle's form then declined and they ended the 1933–34 season being relegated to the Second Division. he had brief spells with Guildford City,  Bradford City and he guested for Hartlepool United during World War II.

References

Newcastle United F.C. players
Guildford City F.C. players
Bradford City A.F.C. players
Association football goalkeepers
English Football League players
Scottish footballers
Hartlepool United F.C. players
Sportspeople from Musselburgh
1910 births
1992 deaths
Footballers from East Lothian